Lundzi is a town in western Eswatini. It is located close to the border with South Africa, 25 kilometres west of the capital, Mbabane.

References
Fitzpatrick, M., Blond, B., Pitcher, G., Richmond, S., and Warren, M. (2004)  South Africa, Lesotho and Swaziland. Footscray, VIC: Lonely Planet.

Populated places in Eswatini